Gabriel Fontaine (born 17 September 1940 in Saint-Lambert-de-Lauzon, Quebec)
was a Progressive Conservative member of the House of Commons of Canada. He was a chartered administrator and consultant by career.

He represented the Quebec riding of Lévis where he was first elected in the 1984 federal election and re-elected in 1988, therefore becoming a member in the 33rd and 34th Canadian Parliaments. Fontaine did not seek a third term in Parliament and left federal politics in 1993.

External links
 

1940 births
Living people
Members of the House of Commons of Canada from Quebec
Progressive Conservative Party of Canada MPs
People from Chaudière-Appalaches